Yuriy Oleksandrovych Seleznyov (born 18 December 1975 in Odessa) is a Ukrainian football coach and a former player. He works as a coach in the FC Chornomorets Odesa academy.

Honours
Chornomorets Odesa
Ukrainian Premier League runner-up: 1994–95, 1995–96

Shakhtar Donetsk
Ukrainian Premier League runner-up: 1997–98, 1998–99, 1999–2000

Metalurh Donetsk
Ukrainian Premier League bronze: 2001–02, 2002–03

External links
 

1975 births
Footballers from Odesa
Living people
Ukrainian footballers
FC Chornomorets-2 Odesa players
SC Odesa players
FC Chornomorets Odesa players
Ukrainian Premier League players
FC Shakhtar Donetsk players
FC Shakhtar-2 Donetsk players
FC Rostov players
Russian Premier League players
Ukrainian expatriate footballers
Expatriate footballers in Russia
FC Metalurh Donetsk players
FC Kryvbas Kryvyi Rih players
FC Hoverla Uzhhorod players
SC Tavriya Simferopol players
FC Stal Kamianske players
Association football forwards
FC Spartak Nizhny Novgorod players